Live From The Streets is a video production company and record label by American producer Mr. Green and director Sam Lipman-Stern.  The company is known for having a series on VICE as well as going viral on the TikTok app via the song “If I don't go to Hell”.  A new version was released in 2021 and reached the top 40 charts.  The original Live from the Streets album began charting again in 2021 in several countries and reached #1 on iTunes.

Background 
Live from the Streets started as a video series created by producer Mr. Green and director Sam Lipman-Stern most known for airing on VICE's music channel Noisey and Green Label. The series, follows Green globally on a journey meeting interesting people and musicians on the streets. Green samples their music; interviews the street performer; and then turns the sounds into original beats. After the beat is created, he collaborates with a rapper or singer to add powerful lyrics to the musical backdrop he and the street musician constructed. Finally, at the end of each episode, Green revisits the people he sampled to play them the final track; oftentimes receiving emotional responses from people who have never heard themselves on recorded audio. The final episodes are a unique hybrid music/video experience. Mr. Green has compiled the songs from the series into an album, and released 'Live From The Streets' on April 7, 2015 via Duck Down Music Inc. and their own production company.  On December 1st 2021 a new "If I Don't Go To Hell 3022" EP was released featuring KRS-One and Trippie Redd along with an intro by Ghostface Killah.  The EP reached the top 40 on iTunes.

Track listing 
All tracks produced by Mr. Green

Personnel 
Adoated from Discogs and Allmusic

Apollo The Great - featured artist
Benefit - featured artist
Bodega Bamz - featured artist
Chill Moody - featured artist
Chris Conway - mixing (tracks: 3, 4, 5, 8)
Deniro Farrar - featured artist
Dru Ha - management
Freddie Gibbs - featured artist
Hakim Green - featured artist
James Niche - artwork,  management
KG - featured artist
KRS-One - featured artist
Malik B. - featured artist
Matisyahu - featured artist
Mr. Green - primary artist,  executive producer,  mixing (tracks: 1, 2, 6, 7, 9-14, 16)
Noah Friedman - management
Ohla - mixing (track 15)
Pacewon - featured artist
Raz Fresco - featured artist
Rich Kidd - featured artist
Sam Lipman-Stern - executive producer
Slaughter Rico - featured artist
Tre Mission - featured artist
Vinnie Paz - featured artist
World's Fair - featured artist

References

External links 
 
 

2015 compilation albums